Christoffel Cornelis Froneman, commonly known as Stoffel Froneman (Leliehoek, Winburg, 26 March 1846 – Cypress, District Marquard, 12 March 1913), was veldkornet, general and Vice-Commander-in-Chief of the Orange Free State Boer forces during the Anglo-Boer War of 1899-1902.

He took part in both the Basotho War between the Orange Free State and the Basothos under King Mosjwesjwe and the Anglo-Boer War and he distinguished himself to such an extent that his promotions followed each other in quick succession. At the outbreak of the war he was Commandant of the Ladybrand Commando.

In early February 1900, together with Generaal de Wet, he took part in the Battle of Koedoesberg (near Ritchie, South Africa), west of the Boer positions at Magersfontein. When General Piet Cronjé surrendered at Paardeberg on 27 February 1900, Froneman, with the help of General De Wet, managed to escape and was promoted to General. Near Sannapos (Afrikaans: Slag van Sannaspos, 31 March 1900) and in the Battle near Brandwaterkom (Brandwater Basin) he really excelled. Near Pompje he raided a train and all over the region he caused havoc for the British and inflicted great damage.

By 1901 he was the Vice-Commander-In-Chief for the entire Eastern Orange Free State. Froneman fought until the end of the Anglo-Boer War and took part in the Peace Treaty negotiations in Vereeniging, where he voted for peace.

On June 11, 1902 General Froneman and about 800 Boer commandos surrendered near Winburg to General Elliott. Nearly every one handed in a rifle with bandoliers, but, like other commandos which had come in, they spent nearly all their ammunition in game-shooting since peace was declared. The Boer generals and the commandants and Field Cornets were allowed to retain their private rifles.

References

Boer military personnel of the Second Boer War
1913 deaths
1846 births